Henry Coyle may refer to:

Henry Coyle (boxer) (born 1982), Irish boxer
Henry Coyle (politician) (died 1979), Irish army officer and Cumann na nGaedhael politician